Charlie Took Essome (born 25 May 1993), known simply as Charlie, is a Cameroonian footballer who plays as a central defender in UB Conquense

Club career
Born in Douala, Charlie moved to Spain in his early teens, joining RCD Mallorca's youth system. Still a junior he began appearing in senior competitions with the B-side, but played only four games in two Segunda División B seasons combined.

On 25 August 2012, Charlie made his first-team – and La Liga – debut, coming on as a 77th-minute substitute for Emilio Nsue in a 1–1 draw against Málaga CF. On 25 July 2014 he signed for another reserve team, UD Almería B.

On 5 July 2016, Charlie was promoted to the Andalusians' main squad in Segunda División. However, after being deemed surplus to requirements by manager Fernando Soriano, he moved to third level club Arandina CF on 31 August.

References

External links

Charlie Took at La Preferente

1993 births
Living people
Footballers from Douala
Cameroonian footballers
Association football defenders
La Liga players
Segunda División B players
Tercera División players
RCD Mallorca B players
RCD Mallorca players
UD Almería B players
Arandina CF players
UD Somozas players
UB Conquense footballers
Cameroonian expatriate footballers
Expatriate footballers in Spain
Cameroonian expatriate sportspeople in Spain
Cameroon youth international footballers